The Department of Post-Secondary Education, Training and Labour is a department of the government of New Brunswick.  It was created in 2006 from the Department of Training and Employment Development and parts of the Department of Education as the Department of Post-Secondary Education and Training, "labour" was added to its name later in 2006.

Ministers

See Department of Post-Secondary Education, Training and Labour (New Brunswick)

References

External links
Tourism and Parks website 

Post-Secondary Education, Training and Labour, Department of